... Efter stormen (After the Storm) is the third studio album by Swedish singer-songwriter Marie Fredriksson, released on 12 October 1987 by EMI Sweden. Her first release since Roxette's commercial breakthrough in Sweden, the album was a massive success, peaking at number one on the Swedish Albums Chart and selling over 50,000 copies within a month of release. It has since been certified platinum by the Swedish Recording Industry Association for shipments in excess of 100,000 units.

The title track preceded the album as its first and only commercial single, although "Bara för en dag" was also a top ten hit on the Swedish Airplay Chart. The record won Best Swedish Album at the 1987 Rockbjörnen awards, where Fredriksson won the award for Best Swedish Female. It also received a nomination at the 1988 Grammis Awards, the Swedish equivalent of the Grammy Awards. The album was remastered and reissued in 2003 with three bonus tracks.

Background and recording
Following the release of Fredriksson's previous album – Den sjunde vågen – in February 1986, she formed pop duo Roxette with Per Gessle, who released their first album – Pearls of Passion – later that same year. Both records were commercially successful in Sweden, with Fredriksson's album selling more than 90,000 copies, and Roxette's selling almost 200,000 copies. ... Efter stormen was recorded over two separate sessions at EMI Studios in May and September 1987. Recording was interrupted by Roxette's co-headlining concert tour with Eva Dahlgren and Ratata: "Rock runt riket" ("Rock Around the Kingdom"), which ran from July to August.

Gessle initially argued against Fredriksson returning to her solo work, saying that any solo album and resulting tour would negatively impact the duo's chances of achieving international success. Despite these objections, she returned to EMI Studios in September to finish recording ... Efter stormen, with Gessle using any excess studio time to record demos for Roxette's second album, Look Sharp!. ... Efter stormen was recorded with many of the same musicians who performed on Den sjunde vågen, although the record features sparser instrumentation than that release; songs are mainly rock and folk-based, and contain almost none of the synthesizer prevalent on her earlier work. The album's second track, "Om du såg mej nu" ("If You Saw Me Now"), was written by Fredriksson in dedication to her father, who died in 1981, prior to her achieving any form of commercial success as a recording artist.

Release and reception
The album was preceded by the release of its only commercial single, "Efter stormen". The song became her first top ten hit in her home country, peaking at number seven on the Swedish Singles Chart, and at number two on the Swedish Airplay Chart. The album was a commercial success upon release on 12 October 1987, debuting at number three on the Swedish Albums Chart before peaking at number one for two consecutive weeks. It sold over 50,000 copies within a month of release, and was promoted with a concert tour of Sweden, which ran for 33 sold-out performances between October and December. By the end of 1987, the album was certified platinum by the Swedish Recording Industry Association, denoting shipments of over 100,000 units. The record won Best Swedish Album at the 1987 Rockbjörnen awards, where Fredriksson was also awarded Best Swedish Female. At the beginning of 1988, "Bara för en dag" became a top ten hit on the Swedish Airplay Chart, and Fredriksson was nominated in the Pop/Rock—Female category at the 1988 Grammis Awards, the Swedish equivalent of the Grammy Awards.

Formats and track listings
All songs written by Marie Fredriksson and Lasse Lindbom, except "Aldrig som främlingar" written by Ulf Schagerström.

Personnel
Credits adapted from the liner notes of ... Efter stormen.

 Recorded at EMI Studios in Stockholm, Sweden in May and September 1987
 Mastered by Peter Dahl at Polar Mastering, Stockholm

Musicians
 Marie Fredriksson – vocals, lyricist, composition and piano
 Per Andersson – drums and programming
 Staffan Astner – electric guitars
 Richard "Ricky" Johansson – bass guitar and electric upright bass
 Leif Larson – keyboards

Technical personnel
 Kjell Andersson – sleeve design
 Denise Grünstein – photography
 Lars-Göran "Lasse" Lindbom – composition, production
 Alar Suurna – engineering

Additional musicians

 Andreas Alin – flute 
 Sara Aronson – horn 
 Jörgen Astner – mandolin 
 Tomas Gertonsson – contrabass 
 Erik Häusler – saxophone 
 Ingalill Hillerud – contrabass 
 Henrik Janson – wind and string arrangements 
 Ulf Janson – wind and string arrangements 
 Mårten Larsson – oboe 
 Elmér Lavotha – cello 
 Leif Lindvall – trumpet 
 Mikael Lundbald – violin 
 Thomas Lundbald – violin 
 Per Malmstedt – synthesizer 
 Karl "Kalle" Moraeus – violin 
 Tove Naess – backing vocals 
 Ki Rydberg – backing vocals 
 Mikael Sjörgen – cello 
 Jan-Erik Skoglund – bassoon 
 Arne Stenlund – viola 
 Sten-Johan Sunding – viola 
 Anette Vistrand – violin

Charts and certifications

Weekly charts

Certifications

Release history

References
Notes

Citations

External links

1987 albums
Marie Fredriksson albums